Marjorie Lane (February 21, 1912 – October 2, 2012) was an American singer of the 1930s, who is best known for providing the singing voice of actress Eleanor Powell's characters in the movies Born to Dance (1936), Broadway Melody of 1936, 
Rosalie (1937), and Broadway Melody of 1938.

Lane was married to actor Brian Donlevy from 1936 to 1947, and they had one child. Her career in film did not extend beyond the 1930s. She was often confused with a Broadway performer of the same name, who began appearing on Broadway in 1913. Lane lived in Santa Monica, California, where she died on October 2, 2012 at the age of 100.

References

External links
 
 
Solid!: Marjorie Lane

1912 births
2012 deaths
American women singers
American centenarians
Place of birth missing
Women centenarians
21st-century American women